The mangrove fantail (Rhipidura phasiana) is a species of bird in the family Rhipiduridae. It is found in the Aru Islands and along the coast of southeastern New Guinea, western and northern Australia.

Its natural habitat is subtropical or tropical mangrove forests.

References

mangrove fantail
Birds of the Aru Islands
Birds of Western Australia
Birds of the Northern Territory
mangrove fantail
Taxonomy articles created by Polbot